SMK PGRI 05 Jember is a vocational high school in Kencong, Jember, East Java, Indonesia. The school is often called "Smegrima". In 2009, it had 19 male teachers and 11 female teachers.

The school has specialized programmes in secretarial studies, accounting, and sales.

References 

Schools in Indonesia
Schools in East Java